PersaCon, originally ChibiCon, was an anime convention held in various locations around Alabama. PersaCon was the first anime convention to be held in the state of Alabama.

Programming
PersaCon typically featured costume contests, dances, dealer's room, karaoke contests, live concerts, panels, speed dating, and workshops.

History
The convention moved to the Von Braun Center in 2008 due to continued growth, but did not return to the location due to the cost. Portions of the conventions proceeds in 2010 went towards Operation Anime Storm and Cystic Fibrosis Foundation.

Event history

References

Defunct anime conventions
Recurring events established in 2003
Recurring events disestablished in 2011